The Maryland Eastern Shore Hawks men's basketball team is the basketball team that represents University of Maryland Eastern Shore in Princess Anne, Maryland, United States. The school's team currently competes in the Mid-Eastern Athletic Conference. They have never played in the NCAA Division I men's basketball tournament. The Hawks are led by head coach Jason Crafton.

Postseason results

National Invitation Tournament results
The Hawks have appeared in the National Invitation Tournament one time. Their record is 1–1.

CollegeInsider.com Postseason Tournament results
The Hawks have appeared in the CollegeInsider.com Postseason Tournament one time. Their record is 0–1.

The Basketball Classic results
The Hawks have appeared in The Basketball Classic one time. Their record is 0–1.

NAIA tournament results
The Hawks have appeared in the NAIA Tournament seven times. Their combined record is 10–7.

References

External links
Team website